Canal Walk is a shopping centre located in Cape Town, South Africa. It is largest shopping centre in the city. Built in what the developers call "Cape Venetian architecture", the shopping centre hosts over 400 stores, 7,000 parking bays, numerous restaurants, 12 cinemas plus a game arcade.  

The mall is home to some of the best-known stores around the world, including: 

 H&M 
 McDonald's 
 Starbucks 
 Burger King

Gallery

External links
Canal Walk website
Century City website

References 

Shopping malls established in 2000
Shopping centres in Cape Town